A Foxhound is a type of dog.

Foxhound may also refer to:

Foxhound, the NATO reporting name for the Russian Mikoyan MiG-31 fighter aircraft.
FOXHOUND, the name of a fictional special forces group in the Metal Gear video game series
Foxhound, a UK armoured vehicle designed to replace the Snatch Land Rover
Six ships of the Royal Navy